The Cal State San Bernardino Yotes are the men's and women's intercollegiate athletic teams of California State University, San Bernardino. The athletic department was established in 1984 and the school's athletic mascot is the Yotes, derived from Coyote. The school's official colors are coyote blue and black.

The Yotes compete in the California Collegiate Athletic Association (CCAA) in the NCAA's Division II.

Mascot & Brand 
From 1984 to 2020, CSUSB's athletics programs went exclusively by the Coyotes. In August 2019, the department began to roll out the Yotes brand. In August of 2020, the department fully released the Yotes logo, as well as an updated Coyote Head mascot that replaced all gray with white. Since then, the athletics department has only referred to themselves as the Yotes.

Sports

The athletics department offers baseball, men's and women's basketball, women's cross country, men's golf, men's and women's soccer, softball, women's track and field and women's volleyball. The athletic department also sponsors the CSUSB Spirit Squad.

Championships
Since 1984, the Yotes have won one team and one individual national championship. In 2019 the Women's Volleyball team became only the third school in NCAA Division II history to go undefeated at 33-0 on its way to winning the national championship. CSUSB has also won many local and regional championships and regularly finish high up in national tournaments. The men's soccer team went to the NCAA Division III national semifinals in 1987 and captured the university's first NCAA Division II California Collegiate Athletic Association title in 1991. In 1997, Scott Householder grabbed the university's first individual national championship with a 273 for 72 holes, a record that still stands. Men's golf has finished third in the national tournament three times in its history.

The men's baseball team took West Region titles in 1990 and 1991. The men's basketball team has won three West Region titles, 11 CCAA championships, and has made one appearance in the NCAA Division II national semifinals.

The CSUSB women's volleyball team has won 14 CCAA and 8 West Region titles, has gone to the NCAA Division II quarter finals in 2017,semifinals three times, in 2003, in 2008, when it advanced to the finals, 2009, 2011 and 2019 when it won the final.

NCAA Appearances
The CSUSB Yotes competed in the NCAA Tournament across 7 active sports (3 men's and 4 women's) 55 times at the Division II level.

 Men's basketball (13): 1999, 2000, 2001, 2002, 2003, 2004, 2005, 2007, 2008, 2009, 2010, 2013, 2014, 2020, 2022, 2023
 Women's basketball (5): 1994, 1998, 2007, 2008, 2011
 Men's golf (9): 1992, 1996, 1997, 1998, 2006, 2007, 2008, 2009
 Men's soccer (3): 1991, 2009, 2010
 Women's soccer (2): 2003, 2013
 Softball (4): 2008, 2011, 2017, 2018
 Women's volleyball (18): 2000, 2001, 2002, 2003, 2004, 2005, 2006, 2007, 2008, 2009, 2010, 2011, 2012, 2013, 2014, 2015, 2016, 2017, 2018, 2019

Individual

CSU San Bernardino had 1 Coyote win an NCAA championship at the Division II level.

Facilities
The men's and women's basketball and women's volleyball teams play in the James & Aerianthi Coussoulis Arena and the baseball team plays at Fiscalini Field. Both soccer teams compete at Premier Field while Softball plays at CSUSB Softball Park.

References

External links
Official website

 
1984 establishments in California